Blackbird is a 2013 drama film written and directed by Jamie Chambers. The film stars Scottish Gaelic actor and comedian Norman Maclean (Scottish Gaelic: Tormod MacGill-Eain) alongside Scottish folklorist and singer Margaret Bennett and Traditional Folk singer Sheila Stewart. Actors Scarlett Mack, Andrew Rothney and Patrick Wallace also appear.

Accolades
In 2013 Blackbird was nominated for the Scottish BAFTA Audience Award, the Audience Award at Cambridge Film Festival, and the Michael Powell Award for Best British Feature Film at Edinburgh International Film Festival and won the 'Catty Award' for Narrative Feature at Catskill Mountains Film Festival, US. Blackbird won two awards in 2014 - the Festival Award for Best International Film at Laughlin International Film Festival and an honorable mention for Best Feature Film at New Jersey International Festival.

References

External links

British drama films
2013 films
2010s English-language films
2010s British films